Kim Byung-man (born July 29, 1975) is a South Korean comedian, best known for his slapstick and acrobatic stunts as a Master in Gag Concert, and survival skills in Law of the Jungle  as he acts as the Chief of the show. In November 2015, he entered a new program on SBS titled 'Shaolin Clenched Fists', where Kim Byung-man and a group of other celebrities visit the Shaolin Monastery to learn the traditional martial arts from Shaolin Masters.

Biography
Kim was born into a poor family with an older sister and two younger sisters in Jeonju, Wanju in North Jeolla Province. His father was an alcoholic, because of his bad luck in business. This caused his family to be in chronic debt. His mother tried to make a little money working at odd jobs, such as working at a restaurant.  Kim also tried to help raise money for the family by doing manual labor. Wanting to be a comedian, he left his home and moved to Seoul to go to an apartment with other aspiring comedians. After three failed auditions on KBS and four on MBC, he was finally accepted by KBS in 2002. He starred in Gag concert on the Master show as a Master, his most famous role, in which he performs difficult tasks, showcasing his ability to acquire new skills quickly.

Kim made his first appearance in the movie called "Gift" (선물) in 2002. He was also the runner-up on Kim Yuna's Kiss and Cry where famous entertainers learn how to figure skate from professionals.

Up till 2012 he was signed under Castle J Entertainment, and on 19 September, it was announced that he has signed exclusive contracts with SM C&C, a subsidiary of SM Entertainment, along with Lee Soo Geun.

Personal life 
In May 2022, Kim's mother died in a flood and a private funeral was planned.

Filmography

Film

Television series

Television shows

Awards and nominations

State honors

Listicles

Notes

References

External links
 
 Kim Byung-man Fan Cafe at Daum 
 Kim Byung-man at S.M. Culture & Contents 
 
 
 
 

1975 births
Living people
South Korean comedians
South Korean male television actors
South Korean male film actors
Gag Concert
Konkuk University alumni
Best Variety Performer Male Paeksang Arts Award (television) winners